The 2009 European Cup Winter Throwing was held on 14 and 15 March at the Estadio de Los Realejos in Tenerife, Spain. It was the ninth edition of the athletics competition for throwing events and was organised by the European Athletics Association and the Real Federación Española de Atletismo (Spanish athletics federation). The competition featured men's and women's contests in shot put, discus throw, javelin throw and hammer throw. In addition to the senior competitions, there were also under-23 events for younger athletes. A total of 226 athletes from 29 nations entered the competition. It was the first time that Spain hosted the competition.

On the first day of competition, Anita Włodarczyk had a world-leading and personal best mark of 75.05 metres to win the women's hammer throw. Nicoleta Grasu was dominant in the women's discus, while Lajos Kürthy edged the host's Manuel Martínez in the men's shot put by six centimetres (both reached the 20-metre mark). Tino Häber took the men's javelin title with his first throw of 77.78 m.

The highest calibre performance on the second day came from Gerd Kanter, whose throw of 69.70 m won the men's discus by nearly five metres – only he threw further in the event that year. In the men's hammer, a close contest between Krisztián Pars and Marco Lingua resulted in the season's first throw over eighty metres, with Pars taking the win with 80.38 m. Nadzeya Astapchuk also had a duel against Anca Heltne in the women's shot put – in spite of being in comparatively poor form Astapchuk still won by a margin of four centimetres. Mariya Abakumova won the women's javelin, which had only moderate performances in the still conditions in Los Realejos.

In the under-23 section, Yury Shayunou's hammer throw of 78.59 m would have ranked him third in the senior competition. Meanwhile, in the under-23 women's javelin, the world junior record holder Vira Rebryk won by almost five metres.

Due to the number of entrants in some events (men's shot put, discus and hammer/women's discus, hammer and javelin), "A" and "B" fields competed separately, with higher ranked athletes going in the "A" category. The performances of each field were combined for the final standings. Three "B" group competitors reached the top three of their events: Markus Münch, Vera Begić and Ásdís Hjálmsdóttir. Three national records were broken during the competition. Petros Sofianos improved the Cypriot record in the men's hammer to 65.05 metres, while in the women's javelin Ásdís Hjálmsdóttir set an Icelandic best of 60.42 m ahead of Elisabeth Pauer's Austrian record of 58.37 m. Javier Cienfuegos, an eighteen-year-old Spaniard, achieved a national junior record in winning the javelin "B" competition with his throw of 73.18 m.

Medal summary

Senior

Under-23

References

Results
Los Realejos  ESP  14 - 15 March. Tilastopaja. Retrieved on 2013-04-14.

External links
Official competition website
Official European Athletics website

European Throwing Cup
European Cup Winter Throwing
Sport in Tenerife
International athletics competitions hosted by Spain
2009 in European sport